Nepal Bangladesh Bank Ltd. also known as NBB  or NB Bank was a public owned commercial bank in Nepal. It was established in June 1994 with an authorized capital of Rs. 240 million and paid up capital of Rs. 60 million as a joint venture Bank with IFIC Bank of Bangladesh.  The Nabil Bank Ltd. successfully acquired Nepal Bangladesh Bank Ltd. hence starting a joint venture from 11 July 2022. The bank will further operate in the name of Nabil Bank Limited.

Its head office is at Kamaladi-28, Kathmandu. It had a network of 111 branches, 8 Extension Counters, 5 Branchless banking, and 87 ATM terminals. It also provides e-banking and mobile banking services.

References

Banks of Nepal
Banks established in 1994
1994 establishments in Nepal